Hu Ping-chuan (born 1936, also known as Hu Bingquan), is a male former international table tennis player from China.

Table tennis career
He won two bronze medals at the 1956 World Table Tennis Championships and 1957 World Table Tennis Championships in the Swaythling Cup (men's team event).

See also
 List of table tennis players
 List of World Table Tennis Championships medalists

References

Chinese male table tennis players
1936 births
Table tennis players from Guangdong
Living people
World Table Tennis Championships medalists
Date of birth missing (living people)